Soudron is a commune in the Marne department in north-eastern France. The town of Soudron belongs to the canton of Châlons-en-Champagne-3 and the arrondissement of Châlons-en-Champagne. The number of inhabitants of Soudron
in 2017 was 301.

The town's surface is 43.0 km². It is situated at an elevation of about 114 meters.

See also
Communes of the Marne department

References

Communes of Marne (department)